Mary Leadbeater (December 1758 – 27 June 1826) was an Irish author and diarist.

Early years and education
Leadbeater was born in Ballitore, Athy, County Kildare, Ireland. She was the daughter of Richard Shackleton (1726–1792) by his second wife, Elizabeth Carleton, and granddaughter of Abraham Shackleton, schoolmaster of Edmund Burke. Her parents were Quakers. She was thoroughly educated, and her literary studies were aided by Aldborough Wrightson, a man of great ability who had been educated at Ballitore school and had returned to die there. In 1784 she travelled to London with her father and paid several visits to Burke's town house, where she met Sir Joshua Reynolds and George Crabbe. She also went to Beaconsfield, and on her return wrote a poem in praise of the place and its owner, which was acknowledged by Burke, 13 December 1784, in a long and eulogistic letter. On her way home she visited, at Selby, Yorkshire, some primitive Quakers whom she described in her journal.

Career
In 1791 she married William Leadbeater, a former pupil of her father, and they resided in Ballitore. Leadbeater, who traced his descent from the Huguenot family of Le Batre, was a small farmer and landowner, and his wife kept the village post office. They had six children among them Lydia Fisher, Mary, Margaret and Sarah who married John Barrington a member of the Quaker family who made candles and soap.

On her father's death, Leadbeater received a tender letter of consolation from Burke.

She had from time to time written poems, and in 1794 published anonymously in Dublin Extracts and Original Anecdotes for the Improvement of Youth, which begins with "some account of the society of the people call Quakers", contains several poems on secular subjects, and concludes with "divine odes". She was in Carlow on Christmas Day 1796 when the news arrived that the French fleet had been seen off Bantry, and she describes the march out of the troops. On 28 May 1797 Burke wrote one of his last letters to her. Ballitore was occupied in 1798 first by yeomanry,  "from whose bosom," wrote Mary Leadbeater, "pity seemed banished." Next came the quartering of soldiers on the town, the Suffolk Fencibles and the Ancient Britons, who commenced torturing and flogging the inhabitants. "The village, once so peaceful, exhibited a scene of tumult and dismay; and the air rang with the shrieks of the sufferers, and the lamentations of those who beheld them suffer," she wrote. A force of about 300 rebels then occupied the town and carried out reprisals, but who fled the following day on the approach of a force of soldiers.  These soldiers in turn exacted reprisals on the locals, even killing the local doctor, Johnston. Mary Leadbeater wrote of the killing of her friend: "He was alone and unarmed when seized, and I believe had never raised his hand to injure any one." The soldiers sacked the town, burned many houses and smashed up the rest, and one of them almost killed Mary Leadbeater, who had to flee with a number of other women.

In 1808 she published Poems with a metrical version of her husband's prose translation of Maffæus Vegio's Thirteenth Book of the Æneid. The poems are sixty-seven in number; six are on subjects relating to Burke, one in praise of the spa of Ballitore, and the remainder on domestic and local subjects. She next published in 1811 Cottage Dialogues among the Irish Peasantry, of which four editions, with some alterations and additions, had appeared by 1813. The dialogues are on such subjects as dress, a wake, going to the fair, a spinning match, cow-pock, cookery, and matrimony. William P. Le Fanu (1774–1817) had suggested the design, and the object was to diffuse information about the peasantry. In 1813 she tried to instruct the rich on a similar plan in The Landlord's Friend. Intended as a sequel to Cottage Dialogues, in which persons of quality are made to discourse on such topics as beggars, spinning-wheels, and Sunday in the village, Tales for Cottagers, which she brought out in 1814 in conjunction with Elizabeth Shackleton, is a return to the original design. The tales illustrate perseverance, temper, economy, and are followed by a curious moral play, Honesty is the best policy.

In 1822 she concluded this series with Cottage Biography, being a Collection of Lives of the Irish Peasantry. The lives are those of real persons, and contain some interesting passages, especially in the life of James Dunn, a pilgrim to Loch Derg. Many traits of Irish country life appear in these books, and they preserve several of the idioms of the English-speaking inhabitants of the Pale. Memoirs and Letters of Richard and Elizabeth Shackleton … compiled by their Daughter was also issued in 1822 (new edition. 1849, edited by Lydia Ann Barclay). Her Biographical Notices of Members of the Society of Friends who were resident in Ireland appeared in 1823, and is a summary of their spiritual lives, with a scanty narrative of events. Her last work was The Pedlars, a Tale, published in 1824.

Besides receiving letters from Burke, Leadbeater corresponded with, among others, Maria Edgeworth, George Crabbe, and Mrs Melesina Trench, and from the age of eleven kept a private journal. She died at Ballitore 27 June 1826, and was buried in the Quaker burial-ground there. She had several children, and one of her daughters, Mrs. Fisher, was the intimate friend of the poet and novelist Gerald Griffin.

Leadbeater's best work, the Annals of Ballitore, was not printed till 1862, when it was brought out with the general title of The Leadbeater Papers (2 vols.) by Richard Davis Webb, a learned and patriotic printer, eager to preserve every truthful illustration of Irish life. It tells of the inhabitants and events of Ballitore from 1766 to 1823, and few books give a better idea of the character and feelings of Irish cottagers, of the premonitory signs of the rebellion of 1798, and of the horrors of the outbreak itself. The second volume includes unpublished letters of Burke and the correspondence with Mrs. Richard Trench and with Crabbe.

References

Sources
 This entry lists:
 Smith, Joseph. A Descriptive Catalogue of Friends' Books
 Webb, Alfred John (1878). A Compendium of Irish Biography, Dublin:Gill
 Memoirs of Mrs. Trench

External links

1758 births
1826 deaths
Irish diarists
People from County Kildare
Irish Quakers
18th-century Irish writers
Women diarists
18th-century Irish women writers
19th-century Irish women writers